A list of films produced in France in 1990.

Notes

References

External links
 1990 in France
 French films of 1990 at the Internet Movie Database
French films of 1990 at Cinema-francais.fr

1990
Films
French